The 1964 Tower Hamlets Council election took place on 7 May 1964 to elect members of Tower Hamlets London Borough Council in London, England. The whole council was up for election and the Labour party won control.

Background
These elections were the first to the newly formed borough council. Previously elections had taken place in the Metropolitan Borough of Bethnal Green, Metropolitan Borough of Poplar and Metropolitan Borough of Stepney. These boroughs were joined to form the new London Borough of Tower Hamlets by the London Government Act 1963.

A total of 115 candidates stood for the 60 seats, across 20 wards. 6 seats in two wards were uncontested. The Labour party fielded a full slate of candidates, while the Liberal and Conservative parties stood 19 and 17 respectively. Other candidates included 13 Communists, 2 Residents, 2 Union Movement, 1 Independent and 1 Independent Labour Party. There were 14 three-seat wards, 3 four-seat wards and 3 two-seat wards.

This election had aldermen as well as directly elected councillors.  Labour got all 10 aldermen.

The Council was elected in 1964 as a "shadow authority" but did not start operations until 1 April 1965.

Election result
The results saw Labour win 55 of the 60 seats, Communists 3 and Residents 2. Conservative and Liberal candidates failed to win any seats. Overall turnout in the election was 16.9%.  This turnout included 197 postal votes.

Ward results

References

1964
1964 London Borough council elections
20th century in the London Borough of Tower Hamlets